Robert Griffiths may refer to:

Robert Griffiths (politician) (born 1952), British communist politician
Robert Griffiths (physicist) (born 1937), American physicist
Robert Griffiths (mathematician), Australian statistician
Robert William Griffiths (1896–1962), Welsh farmer and businessman
Bob Griffiths (writer) (born 1938), American author, playwright and professional speaker
Bob Griffiths (priest) (born 1953), Church in Wales priest
Bob Griffiths (footballer, born 1903) (1903–1970), footballer for Chelsea
Bobby Griffiths (born 1942), footballer for Chester City

See also
Robert Griffith (disambiguation)